On August 10, 1965, a fire erupted in Vault 7, a storage facility, at the Metro-Goldwyn-Mayer studio (MGM) backlot (now Sony Pictures Studios) in Culver City, California. It was caused by an electrical short explosively igniting stored nitrate film. The initial explosion reportedly killed at least one person, and the resulting fire destroyed the entire contents of the vault, archived prints of silent and early sound films produced by MGM and its predecessors. The only known copies of hundreds of films were destroyed.

Background 
The storage vaults, located on Lot 3, were spaced out to prevent fire from spreading between vaults. Studio manager Roger Mayer described the vaults as "concrete bunk houses" and stated that it was considered at the time as "good storage because [the films] couldn't be stolen". The vaults were not equipped with sprinkler systems and had only a small fan in the roof for ventilation. Despite this, Mayer stated that he believed a sprinkler system would have made little difference because "the amount [the studio] lost by fire was minimal".

Unlike most major studios, MGM sought to preserve its early productions, that of its predecessors Metro Pictures, Goldwyn Pictures, and Louis B. Mayer Productions, and prints of films purchased for remake value. The studio did not participate in the common practice of purposeful destruction of its catalog and even sought to preserve films of little apparent commercial value. Beginning in the 1930s, MGM gave prints and negatives of its silent films to film archives, predominantly George Eastman House, and in the early 1960s, it began a preservation program led by Mayer to transfer nitrate film prints onto safety film.

Fire 
Shortly before 10:00 PM on the evening of August 10, 1965, an electrical short ignited nitrate film stored in Vault 7 located on Lot 3, triggering a major explosion and fire which caused the ceiling of the vault to collapse onto the stored cans of film. The initial explosion could be heard from Lots 1 and 2, as recounted by Rudy Behlmer, who was walking between them at the time. Executive Roger Mayer stated that at least one person died in the explosion, though a contemporary newspaper article states that there were no fatalities. The fire was extinguished by responding firefighters, but none of the films stored inside the vault were able to be salvaged.

Due to prior concerted efforts by MGM to preserve its catalog of silent and early sound films, the fire did not result in the total or near-total loss of its library. Despite the fire, 68 percent of silent films produced by MGM survived, the highest rate from any major studio. Nevertheless, the fire destroyed the only known copies of numerous silent films, including Lon Chaney's A Blind Bargain (1922) and London After Midnight (1927), both of which have become highly sought-after, as well as Greta Garbo's The Divine Woman (1928).

See also 
 1937 Fox vault fire
 2008 Universal Studios fire
 List of lost films
 List of incomplete or partially lost films
 List of rediscovered films

References 

MGM Vault Fire, 1965
MGM Vault Fire, 1965
Metro-Goldwyn-Mayer
Lost films
August 1965 events in the United States
Fires in California
MGM Vault Fire
Warehouse fires
Nitrate-film fires in the United States